Castlesteads may refer to one of the following:
Castlesteads, Greater Manchester, an Iron Age promontory fort
Castle Folds, a Romano-British fortified settlement
Camboglanna, also known as Castlesteads, a Roman fort on Hadrian's Wall